The All-American Conference is an Ohio High School Athletic Association (OHSAA)-sanctioned league created in 2008 from the merger of the Trumbull Athletic Conference and Metro Athletic Conference (formerly the Mahoning Valley Conference). 17 sports are offered throughout fall, winter and spring sports seasons. The conference has teams divided into four (4) tiers, depending on sport and includes Gold, Red, White and Blue divisions. Between the merger, the only schools that declined to participate in the merger were the MAC's East Liverpool High School and the TAC's Brookfield High School, with Beaver Local High School joining. 

At its height, the conference had teams divided into four tiers, depending on the eligible enrollment of each school as well as the sport being played, including Gold, Red, White and Blue divisions. In 2017, the Gold division was merged with the Red division, and in 2018, the White division formed its own conference, the Northeast 8 Conference. As of 2020, only the former Red division remains as the Blue division joined the Mahoning Valley Athletic Conference.

Current alignment

Former members

Beaver Local maintained membership in the Ohio Valley Athletic Conference during their tenure in the AAC.
Youngstown East changed their mascot and school colors in 2017.

See also
Ohio High School Athletic Conferences

References

2008 establishments in Ohio
Ohio high school sports conferences
Sports leagues established in 2008